Julius Mader (7 October 1928 – 17 May 2000), also known by his alias Thomas Bergner, was a German jurist, political scientist, journalist and writer.

Life
Mader came from a lower-middle-class family.   Along with millions of other ethnic Germans, his family was forcibly relocated in 1945, ending up in the Soviet occupation zone of what remained of Germany, a region which was in the process of becoming the German Democratic Republic.

Mader attended business college, followed by an apprenticeship as a draper. Then he began to study in the fields of government and law, economics and journalism at the Universities of Berlin and Jena, the Institute of Internal Trade in Leipzig and the German Academy for Political and Legal Science in Potsdam-Babelsberg .

In 1955, he completed a Master of Business Travelers. A member of the SED, from 1958 to 59 he was deputy managing editor at a magazine. From 1960, he began working as a freelance writer. From 1962, he served as officer on special assignment with the code name "Faingold" for the Stasi. In 1965, he received his doctorate from the "Walter Ulbricht" Law Academy ("Deutsche Akademie für Staats- und Rechtswissenschaft "Walter Ulbricht"") at Potsdam-Babelsberg for a dissertation on "The secret services of the German Federal Republic and their subversive activities against the German Democratic Republic". In 1970, he received his habilitation (higher academic qualification) from the Humboldt University of Berlin, for a piece of work co-authored with Albert Charisius on the development, system and operation of the imperialist German secret service.

Mader's military and political writings covered the period of the Nazi era and the Cold War. His books have a circulation of several million, including translations of some books into other.

In his writings, was a special feature for the print media of the GDR. For the book Who's Who in the CIA, Mader had neither a publisher's statement nor a license number. He listed  himself as an editor with the address of Dr. Julius Mader, 1066 Berlin W 66, Mauerstr. 66. Two detachable cards were included in the book, one was to send him corrections and additions, the other was to send him more names of CIA agents and other intelligence officials.

Works
 Allens Gangster in Aktion, Berlin 1959
 Gangster in Action - Design and crimes of the U.S. Secret Service, Berlin, 1961
 The gray hand - a secret settlement with the Bonn, Berlin 1960
 The killer lurking. A documentary on the training and the use of military subversion and sabotage units in the United States and West Germany, Berlin 1961
 The Hunt For The Scarface - A documentary on Hitler's SS intelligence chief, Otto Skorzeny, Berlin 1962
 Geheimnis von Huntsville: die wahre Karriere des Raketenbarons Wernher von Braun [The Secret of Huntsville—The Real Career of Rocketbaron Wernher von Braun], Berlin: Deutscher Militärverlag, 1963
 Dr. sparks concern from Tokyo. A documentary on the spies with peace articles selected by Richard Sorge and Stuchlik with Gerhard Horst Pehnert, Berlin 1965
 The bandit treasure. A documentary on the secret Hitler-gold weapons and treasure, Berlin 1965
 No longer a secret - the secret of the German Federal Republic and its subversive activity against the GDR, Berlin 1966
 Who's Who in CIA: A biographical reference work about 3000 employees of the civilian and military intelligence branches of the U.S. in 120 nations, Berlin 1968
 (With Albrecht Charisius) No longer a secret: development, system and operation of the imperialist German secret service. German military Verlag, Berlin 1969th (4th, revised edition 1980)
 Hitler's generals from intelligence to say: a documentary report on the composition, structure and operations of the Central Intelligence Agency OKW foreign / defense to a chronology of its operations from 1933 in 1944. Publisher of the nation, Berlin 1970
 Yellow List: ("No longer a secret!") Where is the CIA?, Berlin 1970
 Les Generaux espions d'Deposent Hitler. Un Anglais de l'est accuse, Paris 1973
 The bandit treasure. a documentary report on the secret treasure of Hitler's Germany Revised and expanded edition, Berlin 1973
 Instruction 37/57. Facts and background of the coup in Chile in 1973, Berlin 1974
 The way to the 'red' authoritarian state? - The German Social Democracy between feudalism and bourgeois counter-revolution, casting 1977
 Partisans of the mountains. Survival of an Austrian worker with Sepp Plieseis, Berlin 1978
 Neo-colonialist practices of the Federal Republic of Germany in relation to Namibi, Berlin 1978
 The NATO conspiracy with the South African racists, Berlin 1978
 NATO's backing for Southern Rhodesia racists, Berlin 1978
 (With Alexander Blank ) Red Orchestra to Hitler. Publisher of the nation, Berlin 1979
 CIA in Europe. Nature and workings of the criminal intelligence service of the U.S., Berlin 1982
 Dr. concern report. Military Publishing House of the GDR, Berlin 1984. (3rd revised edition 1986 also appeared as:. At a secret door: report of Richard Sorge Pahl-Rugenstein, Cologne 1987.)
 Pinochet's torture catalog, Hamburg 1986
 CIA operation Hindu Kush - intelligence activities in the undeclared war against Afghanistan. Military Publishing House of the GDR, Berlin 1988

References 

Bernd-Rainer Barth, Helmut Müller-Enbergs: Mader, Julius . In: Who was who in the GDR? 5th Edition. Ch Links Verlag, Berlin 2010, volume 2
Paul Maddrell, "What we have discovered about the Cold War is what we already knew: Julius Mader and the Western secret services during the Cold War", Cold War History, Vol. 5, No. 2, May 2005, pp. 235–258, 
Günther book, names and dates of important people of the GDR, Berlin 1987 
Literature by and about Julius Mader
East German writer Julius Mader dies

1928 births
2000 deaths
People from Ústí nad Labem District
East German writers
Sudeten German people
Stasi officers
East German journalists
Historians of espionage
Naturalized citizens of Germany
Humboldt University of Berlin alumni
20th-century German historians
20th-century German male writers
German male non-fiction writers